Telepathic Wanderers, known in Japan as Nanase, is a Japanese manga written by Yasutaka Tsutsui and illustrated by Sayaka Yamazaki. The manga was licensed in English by Tokyopop. The manga is based on Tsutsui's novel, Nanase Futatabi.

Manga
Kodansha released the manga's four tankōbon collected volumes between September 6, 2001 and March 6, 2003. Tokyopop released the manga's four volumes between November 8, 2005 and October 31, 2006.

Volume listing

Reception
Anime News Network's Theorin Martin commends the manga for "solid storytelling and goodly amounts of fan services." Anime News Network's Theorin Martin commends the manga for its artwork but criticises the manga for bring "overly dramatic in normal speech." IGN commends the manga for its art and Japan's Isaac Asimov, Yasutaka Tsutsui, for his storytelling. Mania.com's Jarred Pine commends the manga for its "good entry into the mystery, psychological thriller genre".

References

External links

2004 manga
Kodansha manga
Psychological thriller anime and manga
Seinen manga
Supernatural anime and manga
Tokyopop titles